Setergrotta (or Setergrotten) is a karst cave in Røvassdalen in the municipality of Rana in Nordland, Norway. It has a total depth of 50 meters and explored length of 2.4 kilometers. It is probably connected to the nearby Grønligrotta. The cave contains large galleries and sediments from the latest ice age and younger. It was created 2–300,000 years ago.

References

Caves of Norway
Karst caves
Landforms of Nordland
Rana, Norway
Tourist attractions in Nordland